Carlos Pereira may refer to:
Carlos Pereira (businessman) (born 1952), Portuguese businessman
Carlos Pereira (footballer, born 1910), Portuguese football midfielder
Carlos Pereira (footballer, born 1962), Portuguese football right back
Carlos Alberto Pereira da Silva (Uranio Pereira, born 1977), Brazilian footballer
Carlos Pereira (footballer, born 1996), Paraguayan football right midfielder
Carlos Roberto Pereira (born 1946), Brazilian football manager
Carlinhos (footballer, born November 1986) (Carlos Emiliano Pereira), Brazilian football left back